Tula Paulinea "Tulisa" Contostavlos (Greek: Τούλα Παυλίνα 'Τουλίσα' Κοντόσταυλου; born 13 July 1988) is an English singer, television personality, and actress. As a part of the R&B/hip hop group N-Dubz with her cousin Dappy and friend Fazer, they gained two platinum-certified albums, two gold-certified albums, five MOBO awards, a Brit Award nomination, thirteen top 40 singles, six silver-certified singles, and three Urban Music Awards.

From 2011 to 2012, Tulisa was a judge on the television singing competition The X Factor UK. In 2012, she released her debut solo single "Young", which peaked at number one on the UK Singles Chart. "Live It Up" and "Sight of You" were also hits, reaching the top 20 in the UK. In 2012, Tulisa released her debut studio album, The Female Boss. As an actress, she has starred in the British horror film Demons Never Die and the comedy film Big Fat Gypsy Gangster, both in 2011.

Early life
Tula Paulinea Contostavlos was born on 13 July 1988 in Camden Town, London. Her Irish mother, Anne Byrne, was born in Churchtown, Dublin. Anne and her three sisters went on to form the 1980s big band and swing band Jeep. Tulisa's father, Plato Contostavlos, is Greek Cypriot and at one time was keyboardist with Mungo Jerry. Plato's brother, Byron Contostavlos, was bassist with Mungo Jerry and later became manager of N-Dubz.

When Tulisa was five, her mother, who has bipolar disorder and schizoaffective disorder, was sectioned under the Mental Health Act. The 2010 BBC programme, Tulisa: My Mum and Me, described Tulisa's life looking after her mother before joining N-Dubz. At age 14, with support from her uncle, Byron Contostavlos, she enrolled at Quintin Kynaston School in St John's Wood but later attended Haverstock Secondary School where she did not sit her GCSE examinations.

Career

2000–2011: Career beginnings with N-Dubz

Dappy and Fazer, who had already started rapping together, decided they wanted a female voice in the group, which was called the Lickle Rinsers Crew at the time, and so invited Tulisa to be part of the group. They started performing together as a group around Camden from young ages. Performing as the Lickle Rinsers Crew, they released the singles "Bad Man Riddim" and "Life Is Getting Sicker by the Day", which became hits on pirate radio stations. After Lickle Rinsers Crew, they then became NW1, after the area they hail from, making their first music video in 2005 for the track "Everyday Of My Life", which received airplay on Channel U, recording more demos as NW1 such as "Don't Feel Like Moving", "Girl On Road" and "Livin Broke". Their first single to be released was "You Better Not Waste My Time", which was available for download only until their 2006 self-released single, "I Swear", which gained them their first mainstream notice. In 2007, the group appeared on the UK charts with "Feva Las Vegas" (also self-released), peaking at number 57.

On 6 August 2008, it was announced that the group had left Polydor Records and had signed to All Around the World records. The press release stated that the label would be releasing "Ouch" as the group's first single on the label in September 2008. The group's first album, Uncle B, was released on 17 November 2008. "Strong Again" was touted as the third single to be released from Uncle B and charted for five weeks in the UK Singles Chart, peaking highest at number 24.  Due to the success of their debut album, the group embarked on their first headlining tour, Uncle B tour. The tour was supported by Stevie Hoang and Tinchy Stryder with whom N-Dubz collaborated on his number one single "Number 1". During one performance, Tulisa fainted on stage.

The lead single from the group's second album titled "I Need You" was released on 9 November 2009 and charted at number five in the UK. The album, Against All Odds, was released on 16 November 2009, and charted at number six in the UK Album Chart. It went platinum within approximately two months of release. The second single, "Playing with Fire", features R&B/pop musician, Mr Hudson, and reached number 15 in the UK charts on album downloads alone. In 2010, N-Dubz toured their album, Against All Odds, starting on 31 March and finishing on 20 April.

After much speculation, it was confirmed that US label Def Jam signed the group. The first release was N-Dubz's third studio album, Love.Live.Life. It was released in the UK on 29 November 2010. The group began recording the album following the success of Against All Odds. "We Dance On" was released on 20 May 2010, as the album's lead single. It peaked at number five in the UK. The song was also included on the soundtrack to the film Streetdance 3D. "Best Behaviour" was released on 17 October 2010 as the second single from the album. It peaked at number 10 in both the UK and Scotland and became a top 40 hit in Ireland. "Girls" was released as the album's third single on 12 December 2010. It reached number 19 in the UK.

N-Dubz parted ways with record label Def Jam in August 2011 due to creative differences. The band performed their final gig together in September, with Dappy releasing his solo single "No Regrets" soon after.

2011–2012: Solo success and The X Factor
In 2011, Tulisa replaced Cheryl Cole as a judge for the eighth series of The X Factor. Tulisa mentored the Groups category, which included 4-piece girlband Little Mix (formerly known as Rhythmix). Despite three of her four acts being eliminated in the first five weeks of the show, Little Mix went on to become the most successful girl group in X Factor history. Tulisa returned for the ninth series in 2012. Tulisa mentored the "Girls", a category made up of female contestants aged 16–27, which included Lucy Spraggan and Ella Henderson. Tulisa did not join the tenth series of the show in 2013 and was replaced by original judge, Sharon Osbourne.  The singer briefly returned to The X Factor for its eleventh series as Louis Walsh's guest judge during the judges' houses stage in Bermuda.  She also appeared on the first night of the final temporarily filling in for Mel B who was ill.

In March 2012, a six-minute sex tape of Tulisa and her former boyfriend Justin Edwards emerged on the internet. Tulisa was granted an injunction that legally blocks the distribution of the tape. In the aftermath she recorded a video response on her YouTube account, stating that she was both heartbroken and devastated by Edwards' release of the video.  In July, she settled with Edwards but continued to pursue action against Edwards' former manager Chris Herbert, who had his job as a consultant on The X Factor suspended.

Tulisa released her solo album, The Female Boss, on 3 December 2012, for which she began working on earlier that year.  She described the album as having "a track for every mood," with songs meant for parties, big ballads and "UK urban music." The first single released from the album was "Young", released in April and accompanied by a promotional video filmed in Miami. The song charted at number five on the Irish Singles Chart and number one in the UK. September saw the release of the second single "Live It Up". The song debuted at number 11 in the UK. Around this time, Tulisa released an autobiography titled Honest: My Story So Far.  Tulisa's third solo single "Sight of You" was released together with the album to mostly negative reviews and charted lower than expected at number 18.  The album itself received negative reviews and charted at number 35. In January 2013, Tulisa stated that the album campaign had finished and that no further singles would be released.

Released in November 2012 Britney Spears and will.i.am's single "Scream & Shout" was originally co-written by Tulisa with Jean Baptiste and recorded under the title "I Don't Give a Fuck". The track was intended for Tulisa's debut album. However, the producer of the track, Lazy Jay, did not want Tulisa to have the song and gave it to will.i.am, who re-wrote the song with Spears in mind. The song became a hit, peaking at number one in the UK and number three in the US.  Despite Tulisa's vocals still being heard on "Scream & Shout", she was not credited with co-writing the song upon its release, which prevented her from collecting any royalties. Tulisa filed a lawsuit against will.i.am and won in 2018, entitling her to 10% of publishing rights.

2013–present: Other projects and hiatus
Tulisa began working on a second album in 2013, and continued to record throughout 2014 The single, "Living Without You", was initially planned for release in December 2014, but was eventually released in January the next year. The single peaked at number 44 in the UK. That single was followed two years later by "Sweet Like Chocolate", which featured rapper Akelle.

In 2016, Tulisa signed with an agent in an attempt to begin a career as a film actress, and as of 2018 she is committed to star as Sista C in the upcoming feature film Diva. She had earlier acted with roles such as the role of Laurissa, a cocaine addict who is in R&B group, in the television series Dubplate Drama (2007–09), Shaniqua in the straight-to-DVD British comedy, Big Fat Gypsy Gangster (2011), and Amber in the British slasher film Demons Never Die (2011).

In April 2019, Tulisa released her first single in three years, "Daddy", after signing to Xploded Records, which was founded by the co-founders of All Around the World. Another single, "Sippin'" was released two months later. In the same year, Tulisa performed at various gigs, including Manchester Pride.

In May 2022, it was announced that Tulisa would be reuniting with her N-Dubz band-mates with new music and a tour. The ‘Back To The Future’ tour sold out in three minutes.

Personal life
Despite being baptised in her father's Greek Orthodox faith, Tulisa later became a practising Roman Catholic.

On 4 June 2013, Tulisa was arrested by police on suspicion of supplying class A drugs and bailed to a date in July 2013. Two residential properties had been searched as part of the investigation. She was formally charged on 9 December with "being concerned in the supply of Class A drugs" and appeared at Westminster Magistrates' Court on 19 December where she denied being involved with the supply of 13.9 grams of cocaine. She was granted unconditional bail and then appeared at Southwark Crown Court on 9 January 2014. The trial date was set for 14 July 2014. The case was dismissed as the judge believed prosecution witness and undercover journalist Mazher Mahmood had lied to the court. Mahmood was later sent to prison for 15 months. In July 2014, her documentary Tulisa: The Price of Fame premiered on BBC Three to a moderate success, attracting 615,000 viewers (3.8% of the audience within its time slot).  In April 2015, Justice Nicholas Kearns, President of the Irish High Court, described her as having been "cruelly deceived in a shabby sting operation", but dismissed her attempt to sue the Irish Sun for defamation.

Following the collapse of her drug trial, The Guardian Suzanne Moore discussed her reputation, and wrote that "Tulisa is famously a working class girl made good, though of course made good is never what she is allowed to be". In Moore's opinion, "Tulisa has been branded by the media as a chav and therefore almost anything can be said about her".

On 9 March 2020, Contostavlos revealed she suffered from Bell's palsy.

Discography

 The Female Boss (2012)

Filmography

Television

Film

References

External links

 

1988 births
Living people
Converts to Roman Catholicism from Eastern Orthodoxy
English people convicted of assault
English people of Greek Cypriot descent
English people of Irish descent
English Roman Catholics
English women singer-songwriters
British women pop singers
British hip hop singers
British women hip hop musicians
English women in electronic music
English actresses
People educated at Quintin Kynaston School
People from Camden Town
Singers from London
21st-century English women singers
21st-century English singers
All Around the World Productions artists